Moving is the second album by the American folk music trio Peter, Paul & Mary, released in January 1963. The third single, "Puff, the Magic Dragon,"  was a huge hit and a defining song for the trio, reaching #2 on the Hot 100, #1 on the Easy Listening, and #10 on the R&B Charts.

The lead-off single, "Big Boat," failed to chart substantially, only staying on the Top 100 for two weeks, reaching #93.  Cash Box described it as "an exciting, fast moving folk opus." The second single, "Settle Down (Goin' Down That Highway)," did slightly better, peaking at #56 on the Pop charts during a 6-week run; however, it did become an easy listening hit at #14.

Track listing

Side one
 "Settle Down (Goin' Down That Highway)" (Mike Settle)
 "Gone the Rainbow" (Paul Stookey, Mary Travers, Peter Yarrow, Milt Okun)
 "Flora" (Stookey, Travers, Elaina Mezzetti)
 "Pretty Mary" (Stookey, Elaina Mezzetti, Okun)
 "Puff, the Magic Dragon" (Peter Yarrow, Leonard Lipton)
 "This Land Is Your Land" (Woody Guthrie)

Side two
 "Man Come into Egypt" (Fred Hellerman, Fran Minkoff)
 "Old Coat" (Stookey, Travers, Mezzetti)
 "Tiny Sparrow" (Stookey, Elaina Mezzetti, Milt Okun)
 "Big Boat" (Stookey, Lane, Milt Okun, Elaina Mezzetti)
 "Morning Train" (Mezzetti)
 "A'soalin' (Stookey, Tracy Batteaste, Elaina Mezzetti)

Personnel
Peter Yarrow – vocals, guitar
Noel "Paul" Stookey – vocals, guitar
Mary Travers – vocals

Chart positions

Notes 

Peter, Paul and Mary albums
1963 albums
Warner Records albums
Albums produced by Albert Grossman